Sarah was launched in Spain in 1791, presumably under another name. The British captured her c.1798. She made five voyages as a Liverpool-based slave ship before a Spanish privateer captured her in 1805. On her fifth voyage Sarah had captured two French slave ships at Loango.

Career 
Dolben's Act mandated the maximum number of slaves a vessel could carry without penalty, given her burthen. At a burthen of 190 tons, the cap for Sarah would have been 317, a larger number than she ever carried.

1st slave voyage (1799–1800): Captain John Neal sailed from Liverpool on 1 January 1799. Sarah gathered her slaves at Malembo and delivered 295 to Kingston, Jamaica, on 30 August. She left Kingston on 10 October and arrived back at Liverpool on 1 December.

Sarah entered the Register of Shipping in 1800 with J. Niel, master, J. Ward, owner, and trade Liverpool–Africa. Captain John Neal acquired a letter of marque on  18 February 1800. 

2nd slave voyage (1800–1801): Captain Neal sailed from Liverpool on 13 March 1800, bound for West Central Africa and St Helena. Sarah arrived at Kingston on 28 September and landed 212 slaves. She left Kingston on 27 November and arrived back at Liverpool on 18 January 1801. She had left with 31 crew members and suffered one crew death on the voyage.

3rd slave voyage (1801–1802): Captain Neal sailed from Liverpool on 16 April 1801. Sarah delivered an estimated 280 slaves to Suriname on 26 September. She left Suriname on 28 November and arrived back at Liverpool on 17 January 1802.

4th slave voyage (1802–1803): Captain Henry Kennedy sailed from Liverpool on 29 April 1802. This voyage took place entirely during the Peace of Amiens so he sailed without a letter of marque. Sarah gathered her slaves at Loango and delivered 222 to Havana on 22 November. She arrived back at Liverpool on 20 March 1803. She had left Liverpool with 25 crew members and she suffered one crew death on the voyage.

War with France had resumed on 18 May 1803 and Captain Henry Kennedy acquired a letter of marque on 23 May. 

5th slave voyage (1803–1805): Captain Kennedy sailed from Liverpool on 19 June 1803. Sarah again gathered slaves at Loango.

On 14 August 1803 Kennedy and Sarah captured two French slave ships: Éole and Télémaque. Sarah acquired 180 slaves from Télémaque, and some from Éole.
 
Lloyd's List reported on 20 December 1803 that Telemaque had arrived at Barbados. She was a prize to Sarah, Kennedy, master, of Liverpool, which had captured Telemaque as Telemaque was coming from Africa. 

Lloyd's List reported in March 1803 that Sarahs prize, probably Éole, had arrived at Demerara. 

Sarah arrived at the Bahamas on 24 April 1804 and apparently landed nine slaves there. She then sailed to New Orleans, where she landed 210. She left New Orleans on 3 January 1805 and arrived back at Liverpool on 5 March. She had left Liverpool with 31 crew members and she suffered five crew deaths on the voyage.

Lloyd's Register for 1805 showed Sarahs master as H. Kenedy, changing to G. Best, and her owner as Ward & Co. Captain George Best acquired a letter of marque on 14 May 1805.

6th slave voyage (1805): Captain Best sailed from Liverpool on 13 June 1805. Sarah started gathering slaves at Loango 24 September. She left Africa on 29 September.

Fate
Lloyd's List reported on 4 March 1806 that Sisters, McBride, master, and Sarah, Best, master, had been captured on the coast of Africa and carried into the River Plate. Lloyd's Register for 1807 carried the annotation "capt." by her name.

Reportedly, Sarah arrived at Montevideo on 13 November 1805 and landed 166 slaves. She had left Liverpool with 30 crew members and arrived at Montevideo with 32.

In 1805, 30 British slave ships were lost, of which 13 were lost on the coast of Africa, and 11 were lost in the Middle Passage as they were sailing from Africa to the West Indies. War, not maritime hazards nor slave resistance, was the greatest cause of vessel losses among British slave vessels.

Notes

Citations

References
 
 
 

1791 ships
Captured ships
Age of Sail merchant ships of England
Liverpool slave ships